Early Autumn (Rana jesen) is a Croatian film directed by Toma Janić. It was released in 1962.  The films stars Miha Baloh and Mira Sardoc.

External links
 

1962 films
1960s Croatian-language films
Yugoslav drama films
Jadran Film films
Croatian black-and-white films
Croatian drama films